Christopher Ryan O'Grady (born April 17, 1990) is an American former professional baseball pitcher. He played in Major League Baseball (MLB) for the Miami Marlins.

Career
O'Grady attended Clarkstown High School North in New City, New York, where he played baseball and American football. Playing as a quarterback, O'Grady tore three ligaments in his right knee, which resulted in his missing his senior season at Clarkstown North. He enrolled at George Mason University and played college baseball for the George Mason Patriots. The Los Angeles Angels of Anaheim selected him in the 10th round of the 2012 MLB Draft. The Cincinnati Reds selected him in the 2015 Rule 5 draft. He did not make their roster and was sent back to the Angels.

O'Grady signed a minor league deal with the Miami Marlins on May 4, 2017. The Marlins promoted him to the major leagues on July 8. He became a free agent after the 2018 season.

Personal life
O'Grady's older brother, T.J., also played college baseball for George Mason.

References

External links

1990 births
Living people
People from Congers, New York
Baseball players from New York (state)
Major League Baseball pitchers
Miami Marlins players
George Mason Patriots baseball players
Orem Owlz players
Burlington Bees players
Inland Empire 66ers of San Bernardino players
Mesa Solar Sox players
Arkansas Travelers players
Salt Lake Bees players
Estrellas Orientales players
American expatriate baseball players in the Dominican Republic
New Orleans Baby Cakes players